Joseph Nzau (born April 14, 1949) is a Kenyan former long-distance runner who represented his country at the 1984 Summer Olympics in Los Angeles, California. Nzau won the 1983 Chicago Marathon and the inaugural 1990 Belgrade Marathon.

Running career

Early life
Nzau was a late bloomer who did not take up running until the age of 25. He was subsequently recruited by the University of Wyoming on an athletic scholarship when he was 28, along with a few other Kenyans.

Collegiate
Nzau attended the University of Wyoming under the tutelage of Coach Ron Jones in the late 1970s. At the 1979 NCAA Division I Track and Field Championships, he finished in fifth place. At Wyoming, Nzau earned six All-American honors, graduated with a degree in engineering and was inducted into the university's athletic Hall of Fame in 1997.

Post-collegiate
In 1983, Nzau was the first Kenyan to win in a world-class marathon when he won the 1983 Chicago Marathon. A year later, Nzau finished 7th overall in the men's marathon at the 1984 Summer Olympics. In addition to the marathon, Nzau finished 14th of 16 finishers in the men's 10,000 metres at the same competition. He twice won the Bix 7; Davenport, Iowa, in 1983, 7 miles in a time of 33:10, winning again in 1987 in 33:24.In 1990, Nzau won the inaugural Belgrade Marathon.

Personal
Nzau's grandson Elijah Mwangangi Saolo, is a competitive distance and marathon runner.

Notes
 Nzau's birth date is speculative, as he has reported different ages.

Achievements

References

External links

1952 births
Living people
Kenyan male long-distance runners
Athletes (track and field) at the 1984 Summer Olympics
Olympic athletes of Kenya
Place of birth missing (living people)
University of Wyoming alumni
Chicago Marathon male winners
Kenyan male marathon runners
People from Marsabit County